Scouting in Wyoming has a long history, from the 1910s to the present day, serving thousands of youth in programs that suit the environment in which they live.

Early history (1910–1950)
The Cheyenne Council was founded in 1920, and in 1925 changed its name to the Southeastern Wyoming Council. The Council merged into Longs Peak Council in 1928.

In 1917, the Casper Council  (#638) was formed, changing its name to Casper Area Council in 1925. It reformed in 1918, merging into Central Wyoming Council  (#638)  in 1931.

In 1920, the Sheridan Council (#640), changing its name to Sheridan County Council in 1922; changing its name again to Sheridan Area Council in 1926.

In 1929, the Central Wyoming Council  (#638) was formed.

In southwestern Wyoming the Jim Bridger Council was headquartered in Rock Springs, Wy. The Jim Bridger Council had a Scout Camp at New Fork Lakes on the  northwestern slope of the Wind River Mountains. The Jim Bridger Council encompassed the Green River Basin and included the Woodruff and Randolph Utah Area.  Towns included in the council were  Rock Springs,  Green River, Pinedale, Big Piney, Kemmerer, Opal,  Mountain View,  Lyman, Fort Bridger and Evanston. The council was merged with two councils in Utah in the early 1990's. The council was home to Order of the Arrow Lodge 529 – Tatanka.

During World War II, Norman Mineta was detained in the Heart Mountain internment camp near Cody, Wyoming, along with thousands of other Japanese immigrants and Japanese Americans.  While detained in the camp, Mineta, a Boy Scout, met fellow Scout Alan K. Simpson, future U.S. Senator from Wyoming, who often visited the Scouts in the internment camp with his troop.  The two became, and have remained, close friends and political allies.

Recent history (1950–1990)
In 1954 the National Order of the Arrow Conference was held at the University of Wyoming.

Boy Scouts of America in Wyoming today

There are five Boy Scouts of America (BSA) local councils in Wyoming.

Black Hills Area Council

Black Hills Area Council serves Scouts in South Dakota and Wyoming.  Black Hills Area Council is headquartered in Rapid City, South Dakota.

Adventure West Council

Spanning over half of the state of Wyoming, the Greater Wyoming Council (Central Wyoming Council before 2016) provides service for boys from age 8 to 21. Greater Wyoming Council is headquartered in Casper, Wyoming. In May of 2021 Greater Wyoming Council merged with Longs Peak Council to form Adventure West Council

Organization
 West District
 East District

Camps

Camp Buffalo Bill lies seven miles east of the East Gate of Yellowstone National Park in the Shoshone National Forest. The camp is ideal for troops wishing to have both a Scout camp experience and tour the nation's first national park. Camp Buffalo Bill is also the home of the Yellowstone High Adventure Outpost, a high adventure program where scouts can participate in one of four core areas: Trek, Climbing, Paddlesports, and Winter.

Grand Teton Council

Grand Teton Council is the result of a merger between the Tendoy Area Council and Idaho Falls Council, and serves Scouts in both Idaho and Wyoming.

Longs Peak Council

The Longs Peak Council is headquartered in Greeley, Colorado. Named after the tallest peak in the council territory, Longs Peak Council serves Scouting youth in northeastern Colorado, southeastern Wyoming and western Nebraska.

Trapper Trails Council

The Trapper Trails Council is headquartered in Ogden, Utah. Trapper Trails Council was formed from a merger between Jim Bridger Council, Lake Bonneville Council and Cache Valley Area Council, and serves Scouts in southwestern Wyoming, southern Idaho, and northern Utah.

Girl Scouting in Wyoming

The Girl Scouts of Montana and Wyoming with headquarters in Billings, Montana serves Wyoming. There is a service center in Casper, Wyoming as well as several camps.

See also

Scouting in Idaho
Scouting in Montana
Scouting in Utah

External links
 Greater Wyoming Council
 Black Hills Area Council
 Grand Teton Council
 Longs Peak Council
 Trapper Trails Council
 Girl Scouts of Montana and Wyoming

References

Youth organizations based in Wyoming
Wyoming
Western Region (Boy Scouts of America)